This timeline lists  sovereign states in Europe, both current and defunct, since the 11th century.

See also
List of sovereign states and dependent territories in Europe
List of sovereign states by date of formation
List of predecessors of sovereign states in Europe
Timeline of sovereign states in North America
Timeline of sovereign states in Oceania
Timeline of sovereign states in South America

History of Europe
Lists of former countries
Regional timelines
Former countries in Europe
Europe-related lists